William Harrison Norton was a well-known Missouri lawyer and state senator of Missouri during the 1950s. He was the great-grandson of United States Congressman and Missouri Supreme Court Judge Elijah Hise Norton.

Missouri state senators